Persan-Beaumont Airport is a regional airport in the Val-d'Oise department in Île-de-France in northern France. The airport supports general aviation with no commercial airline service scheduled.

History
Beaumont Sur Oise was a pre-World War II French Air Force airfield with a  concrete runway (05/23).

The airfield was seized by the Germans in June 1940 during the Battle of France.  It was used by the Luftwaffe only sparingly, with Luftlandegeschwader 1 (LLG 1), a glider unit being assigned to the airfield between April and May 1943, equipped with Henschel Hs 126 liaison aircraft; Dornier Do 17s to pull the units DFS 230 transport gliders.  Later, in November and December 1943, Schlachtgeschwader 4 (SLG 4) operated Focke-Wulf Fw 190F/Gs as a ground-attack unit.

Beaumont was attacked on several missions by the United States Army Air Forces Eighth Air Force and IX Bomber Command groups during 1943 and 1944.

The airfield was liberated by Allied ground forces about 3 September 1944 during the Northern France Campaign. Almost immediately, the United States Army Air Forces IX Engineering Command 818th Engineer Aviation Battalion cleared the airport of mines and destroyed Luftwaffe aircraft. Fortunately, little battle damage was sustained, and the airport became a USAAF Ninth Air Force combat airfield, designated as "A-60" about 26 September.

Under American control, the Ninth Air Force assigned the 386th Bombardment Group to the airport which flew B-26 Marauder medium bombers from the facility between 2 October 1944 and 9 April 1945.   The 386th was replaced by the 410th Bombardment Group, an A-26 Invader group, which operated from the airport until June 1945.  The Americans returned full control of the airport to French authorities on 17 July 1945.

Current
After the war, the airport appears to have been torn down, and a new facility constructed about 200m to the southeast.  The wartime concrete runway remains in a field complete with many patches of bomb craters, connected to what appears to be the prewar French air base.  At least one large hangar is still standing, and numerous support buildings.   In addition, old taxiways reduced in width are being used as farm access roads.

Facilities

See also

 Advanced Landing Ground

References

External links
 
 

Airports in Île-de-France
World War II airfields in France
Airfields of the United States Army Air Forces in France